Eco commerce is a business, investment, and technology-development model that employs market-based solutions to balancing the world’s energy needs and environmental integrity.  Through the use of green trading and green finance, eco-commerce promotes the further development of "clean technologies" such as wind power, solar power, biomass, and hydropower.

EcoCommerce is an integrated ecological-economical model that provides a means to account for and value land management activities that improves the condition of natural capital and values the output of ecoservices.  EcoCommerce is more comprehensive than a compilation or organization of ecosystems service markets as it provides the framework to build an ecological intelligence system that allows the public arena of commerce to define sustainability.

References

Gieseke, Tim 2011 EcoCommerce 101: Adding an ecological dimension to the economy.  Bascom Hill Publishing Mpls  www.ecocommerce101.com

Sustainable business